Alessandro Cosimi (born 10 November 1955 in Livorno) is an Italian politician.

After two terms as municipal councillor (1995-1999; 1999-2004), he ran for Mayor of Livorno at the 2004 local elections, supported by a centre-left coalition. He was elected on 13 June and took office on 14 June 2004. Cosimi was confirmed for a second term at the 2009 elections.

See also
2004 Italian local elections
2009 Italian local elections
List of mayors of Livorno

References

External links
 

1955 births
Living people
Mayors of Livorno
Democratic Party (Italy) politicians
Democrats of the Left politicians
Democratic Party of the Left politicians